Stockholm is a village in the Canadian province of Saskatchewan within the Rural Municipality of Fertile Belt No. 183 and Census Division No. 5. The municipal office for the Rural Municipality of Fertile Belt No. 183 is located in Stockholm.

History 
Named after the capital of Sweden, the village was founded in the 1880s by Swedish settlers. Stockholm incorporated as a village on June 30, 1905. According to a Village of Stockholm commemorative plaque dated July 1, 1995, A J Stenberg and wife Svea named the community.

Heritage properties
Landmarks in Stockholm include the New Stockholm Lutheran Church, also called the Swedish Evangelical Lutheran New Stockholm Church, which was erected in 1917 by Swedish immigrants.

Demographics 

Media 
From 1997 to 2007, Jody Herperger operated an FM radio-rebroadcaster CFZY-FM for CHOZ-FM (St. John's, Newfoundland and Labrador). The station filled a need for commercial top-40 programming on the FM band. The station was maintained for a number of years after CFGW-FM in Yorkton started commercial broadcasting, and ended transmissions in 2007.

References

Villages in Saskatchewan
Fertile Belt No. 183, Saskatchewan
Division No. 5, Saskatchewan
Swedish-Canadian culture